Go! Puzzle is a downloadable game on the PlayStation Store developed by Zoonami/Cohort Studios. It was released on November 20, 2007. It is  a number of puzzle games.

Gameplay
Go! Puzzle is a number of puzzle games in one downloadable package.

External links

PS3 Version
 IGN,
 GameSpot,
 MetaCritic,
 EuroGamer,

PSP Version
 IGN,

2007 video games
PlayStation 3 games
PlayStation Network games
PlayStation Portable games
Puzzle video games
Sony Interactive Entertainment games
Video games developed in the United Kingdom
Cohort Studios games
Multiplayer and single-player video games